is a Japanese Sinologist. He was born in Arakawa, Tokyo and graduated from the University of Tokyo.

Selected works 

 Beijing kujūanki: Zhou Zuoren in the Era of the Sino-Japanese War, 『北京苦住庵記 日中戦争時代の周作人』, Chikuma Shobō, Publishers, 1978

External links 

 Amazon

University of Tokyo alumni
1934 births
People from Arakawa, Tokyo
Living people